The Buzoel is a right tributary of the river Buzău in Romania. It discharges into the Buzău near Câineni-Băi.

References

Rivers of Romania
Rivers of Buzău County
Rivers of Brăila County